Mulberry Street may refer to:

Places
Mulberry Street (Baltimore)
Mulberry Street (Manhattan)
Mulberry Street (Springfield, Massachusetts)
Mulberry Street, Philadelphia, renamed Arch Street in 1854
Mulberry Street Bridge, Harrisburg, Pennsylvania

Arts and entertainment
Mulberry Street (EP), by Cold War Kids, 2005
Mulberry Street (film), a 2006 horror film
"Mulberry Street", a song by Twenty One Pilots from Scaled and Icy, 2021

See also
 And to Think That I Saw It on Mulberry Street (1937), Theodor Seuss Geisel's first children's book, published under the pen name Dr. Seuss
"Big Man on Mulberry Street", a song by Billy Joel
 Mulberry (disambiguation)